Jhalkaribai (22 November 1830 – 4 April 1858) was a woman soldier who played an important role in the Indian Rebellion of 1857. She served in the women's army of Rani Lakshmibai of Jhansi. She eventually rose to a position of a prominent advisor to the queen, Rani of Jhansi. At the height of the Siege of Jhansi, she disguised herself as the queen and fought on her behalf, on the front, allowing the queen to escape safely out of the fort.

Life 
Jhalakaribai was born to Sadova Singh and Jamunadevi on 22 November 1830 in Bhojla village in a Koli family near Jhansi.  In her youth, she is claimed to have stood her ground when attacked by a tiger and killed it with an axe. She reportedly once killed a leopard in the forest with a stick she used to herd cattle.

After the death of her mother when she was very young, her father raised her. Consistent with the social conditions of the era, she lacked formal education, but was trained in horseback riding and the use of weaponry.

Jhalkaribai bore an uncanny resemblance to Laxmibai and because of this she was inducted into the women's wing of the army.

Military service 
In the queen's army, she quickly rose in the ranks and began commanding her own army. During the Rebellion of 1857, General Hugh Rose attacked Jhansi with a large army. The queen faced the army with 14,000 of her troops. She waited for relief from Peshwa Nana Sahib's army camping at Kalpi that did not come because Tantia Tope had already been defeated by General Rose. Meanwhile, Dulha Ju, in charge of one of the gates of the fort, had made a pact with the assailants and opened the doors of Jhansi for the British forces. When the British rushed the fort,  Laxmibai, on advice of her courtier, escaped through Bhanderi gate with her son and attendants to Kalpi. Upon hearing of Laxmibai's escape, Jhalkaribai set out for General Rose's camp in disguise and declared herself to be the queen. This led to a confusion that continued for a whole day and gave the Rani's army renewed advantage.

In addition, she was a close confidante and advisor to the queen playing a key role in the analysis of the battle, alongside Laxmibai.

Legacy 

The death anniversary of Jhalkaribai is celebrated as Shahid Diwas (Martyr Day) by various Koli organizations. The movement to establish Bundelkhand as a separate state has also used the legend of Jhalkaribai to create the Bundeli identity. The Government of India's Post and Telegraph department has issued a postal stamp depicting Jhalkaribai.

The Archaeological Survey of India is setting up a museum at Panch Mahal, a five-storey building located inside the Jhansi Fort in remembrance of Jhalkaribai.

She is referred to in the novel Jhansi ki Rani written in 1951 by B. L. Varma, who created a subplot in his novel about Jhalkaribai. He addressed Jhalkaribai as Koli and an extraordinary soldier in Laxmibai's army. Ram Chandra Heran Bundeli novel Maati, published in the same year, depicted her as "chivalrous and a valiant martyr". The first biography of Jhalkaribai was written in 1964 by Bhawani Shankar Visharad,  with the help of Varma's novel and his research from the oral narratives of  Kori communities living in the vicinity of Jhansi.

Writers narrating the story of Jhalkaribai. Efforts have been made to place Jhalkaribai at an equal footing of Laxmibai.  Since the 1990s, the story of Jhalkaribai has  begun to model a fierce form of Koli womanhood, has acquired a political dimension, and her image is being reconstructed with the demands of social situation.

President Ramnath Kovind unveiled the statue of Jhalkari Bai at Guru Tegh Bahadur Complex in Bhopal on 10 November 2017.

Depiction in film
Manikarnika (2019), a Hindi film starring Ankita Lokhande as Jhalkaribai has been made.

See also 
 List of Koli people
 List of Koli states and clans
 Tanaji Malusare
 Rooplo Kolhi
 Uda Devi

References

Sources 

 
 
 
 
 
 
 
 "Bhojla ki beti" Bundeli mahakavya (Dalchand Anuragi, Rajendra Nagar, ORAI) (2010)

Dalit history
1830 births
1890 deaths
History of Uttar Pradesh
Indian women in war
Revolutionaries of the Indian Rebellion of 1857
19th-century Indian women politicians
19th-century Indian politicians
Koli people
Military personnel from Uttar Pradesh
Bundelkhand
People from Jhansi
Women in 19th-century warfare
Women Indian independence activists